DWCP-DTV (channel 21) is a television station in Metro Manila, Philippines, serving as the flagship of the SolarFlix network owned by Southern Broadcasting Network and operated by Solar Entertainment Corporation under subsidiary. Its studios are located at the Third Floor Worldwide Corporate Center, Shaw Boulevard corner EDSA, Mandaluyong, while its hybrid digital transmitting facility is located at the Solar Entertainment Complex, along Nuestra Señora de la Paz Subdivision, Barangay Sta. Cruz, Antipolo, Rizal. SBN-21 became the first local UHF TV station in Metro Manila that broadcast in May 1992 and formerly known as World TV 21. It operates 24 hours daily on cable and satellite TV providers, while it operates daily from 8:00am to 12:00mn on Digital Free TV.

As of September 12, 2019, the station's analog signal is permanently off the air.

History
Southern Broadcasting Network of Davao launched SBN Channel 21, the first local UHF TV station in Metro Manila since 1992. It was then known as World TV 21 by Kampana Television Corporation, which provided programming content from ABC, CNN and ESPN on this channel then. The idea is to bring back programming similar to the forcibly shut-down FEN Channel 17 of the former Clark US Air Base a year earlier due to the eruption of Mt. Pinatubo.

Beginning on January 1, 2008, Solar Entertainment began to lease airtime on SBN, choosing to broadcast programming from its entertainment channel ETC. This partnership ended on March 2, 2011, as Solar transferred ETC to RPN. As a result, SBN renewed partnership with Solar Entertainment to create the news network Talk TV. On October 30, 2012, the channel was renamed as the Solar News Channel.

On December 1, 2013, SNC's programming was moved to RPN for wider national coverage, with ETC returned to SBN a day before.

In 2015, SBN ceased using its old analog transmitter tower at Strata 2000 building in Pasig (which was obvious to consider even after Solar's purchase of SBN due to the old Sign-on and Sign-off sequences) and began using Solar's newly constructed tower located in Antipolo for a clearer and better signal reception in both the analog and digital signals.

As of September 12, 2019, SBN closed down its analog signal in favor of digital TV broadcast.

Areas of coverage

Primary areas 
 Metro Manila 
 Cavite
 Bulacan
 Laguna
 Rizal

Secondary areas 
 Pampanga
 Portion of Nueva Ecija
 Portion of Tarlac
 Portion of Zambales
 Portion of Bataan
 Portion of Batangas
 Portion of Quezon

Digital television

SBN launches its digital television broadcast in 2015. Solar Entertainment supplies its DTV channels through the new platform. For unknown reasons, the transmitter's encryption system was activated throughout its run, making two of the station's subchannels receivable only on set-top boxes with this capability. The technical issue was fixed by September 25, 2017.

Digital channels

DWCP-TV operates on UHF Channel 21 (515.143 MHz).

Analog-to-digital transition

On September 12, 2019, SBN closed down UHF Channel 21's analog signal in preparation of the DTV transition implementation. SBN is the 5th television network in the Philippines to permanently terminate its analog TV broadcasts, and go digital only.

See also
 Southern Broadcasting Network

References

Southern Broadcasting Network
ETC (Philippine TV channel) stations
Television stations in Metro Manila
Television channels and stations established in 1992
Digital television stations in the Philippines